The Health Boards (Membership and Elections) (Scotland) Act 2009 was an Act of the Scottish Parliament to provide for piloting of the election of certain members of Health Boards and to confer a power to extend those elections to all Health Boards, which was passed by the Parliament on 12 March 2009 and received Royal Assent on 22 April 2009. Anyone aged 16 and over will be eligible to vote.

In 2012 an evaluation of the Health Board elections and alternative pilots was published.  Two NHS boards, Dumfries and Galloway and Fife held elections for 10 and 12 members respectively. Two other boards, Grampian and Lothian explored alternative ways of recruiting and selecting two new appointed members each.

The research found direct elections advantages and drawbacks. They directly address issues of local democracy and accountability so have potential to change the way boards function through increasing the level of challenge. A counter argument is that elected boards may not be able to function as effective corporate entities but the researchers saw no evidence of this during the pilot period.

See also
List of Acts of the Scottish Parliament from 1999

References

External links

Acts of the Scottish Parliament 2009
NHS Scotland
Elections in Scotland
Election law in the United Kingdom
NHS legislation